Anne Murray is a Canadian singer.

Anne or Annie Murray may also refer to:

Anne Firth Murray (born 1935), New Zealand author, professor, and nonprofit founder
Anne Halkett (1623–1699), née Murray, religious writer and autobiographer
Anne Lyon, Countess of Kinghorne, Scottish courtier said to have been the mistress of James VI
Anne Murray, Duchess of Atholl (1814–1897), Scottish courtier and close friend of Queen Victoria
Anne Murray (album), a 1996 album by the singer
Anne Murray (gentlewoman) (1755–1849), author
Anne Murray, Viscountess Bayning, on List of life peerages before 1876
Anne Murray (camogie) in Gael Linn Cup 1987
Anne Murray (cricketer) (born 1961), Irish cricketer
Anne Murray Dike (1879–1929), American doctor, chair of the American Committee for Devastated France
Annie Murray (1906–1996), Scottish nurse in the Spanish Civil War
Annie Murray (writer), British romance writer

See also
Ann Murray (born 1949), Irish mezzo-soprano